Gonzalo Ismael Bazán (born 5 May 1989) is an Argentine professional footballer who plays as a midfielder.

Career
San Lorenzo were Bazán's first club, he was in the youth ranks of the club before he made his first-team debut on 4 July 2009 in a 3–0 league win versus Argentinos Juniors. Eleven appearances later, in 2009–10 and 2010–11, Bazán left on loan to join Primera B Nacional team Independiente Rivadavia. He played in 16 league games and scored once for them before returning to San Lorenzo and subsequently 26 matches for his parent club during the 2011–12 Argentine Primera División season. Those were his last appearances for San Lorenzo as he was loaned out in the following two seasons to Instituto and Atlético Tucumán, both of Primera B Nacional, before leaving permanently in 2014 to Ferro Carril Oeste.

He made his Ferro Carril Oeste debut on 3 September in a Primera B Nacional loss to Gimnasia Jujuy. 6 goals in 50 matches came for Bazán at Ferro before he departed to sign for Argentine Primera División club Arsenal de Sarandí. He joined Sarmiento in July 2017.

Career statistics
.

References

External links

1989 births
Living people
Sportspeople from La Rioja Province, Argentina
Argentine footballers
Association football midfielders
Argentine Primera División players
Primera Nacional players
San Lorenzo de Almagro footballers
Independiente Rivadavia footballers
Instituto footballers
Atlético Tucumán footballers
Ferro Carril Oeste footballers
Arsenal de Sarandí footballers
Club Atlético Sarmiento footballers
Gimnasia y Esgrima de Mendoza footballers
Club Atlético Platense footballers
Guillermo Brown de Puerto Madryn footballers
Chacarita Juniors footballers